The NewsGuild-CWA is a labor union founded by newspaper journalists in 1933. In addition to improving wages and working conditions, its constitution says its purpose is to fight for honesty in journalism and the news industry's business practices. The NewsGuild-CWA now represents workers in a wide range of roles including editorial, technology, advertising, and others at newspapers, online publications, magazines, news services, and in broadcast. The current president is Jon Schleuss.

History 

The organization's founders were Joseph Cookman an editor of the New York Post, Allen Raymond of the New York Herald Tribune and Heywood Broun of the New York World-Telegram. The inaugural chapter was based in Cleveland, Ohio, and Carl Randau was its first director from 1934 to 1940. It was originally called the American Newspaper Guild, but it simplified its name to Newspaper Guild in the 1970s to reflect the fact that it also operated outside the United States. It had expanded into Canada in the 1950s.

It became affiliated with the American Federation of Labor in 1936, then left to go into the new Congress of Industrial Organizations in 1937, when it expanded its membership to non-editorial departments. It merged with the Communications Workers of America in 1995. The Guild is also affiliated with the International Federation of Journalists.

The Guild has more than 25,000 members in the United States, Canada and Puerto Rico. Its membership has expanded from just journalists to many other employees of newspapers and news agencies, such as clerks who take classified ads and computer support workers. It also represents workers in a number of other industries.

In 2015, the union changed its name from Newspaper Guild to its current name, NewsGuild, to reflect that newspapers are not the only publishers of news.

In 2021, the union changed its logo to reincorporate an eye motif from the original logos back to the union's founding and to modernize the look of the union for the future.

Broun's influence 
The Newspaper Guild, represented by many journalists and other written media workers since 1933, became one of the most continuous and effective media organizations in the United States. Heywood Broun was one of the most respected journalist and most popular, highly paid contributor. On August 7, 1933, Broun acknowledged the New York World-Telegram column and the progress of the newspaper's business which was successful. He evaluated the progress more closely with his bosses than any other colleague of similar economic standing. Broun wrote, "the fact that newspaper editors and owners are genial folk should hardly stand in the way of organization of a newspaper writers' union. There should be [always] one." His column has influenced journalists from many states to rise up in opposition to the newspaper's authorities and organize by publishers to show the importance of the newspaper union and expanding the foundation.

Heywood launched the Guild during the Depression according to the biography which Richard O'Connor said, "newspapermen to take a more practical view of their working conditions and organize against the rapacity of publishers". During the earlier times of the Guild, there were complaints from the "rapacious" publishers about federal regulation of minimum wages and maximum hours for newsroom workers set by the National Recovery Act. The publishers wanted an amount of money to not pay tax on from the NRA on constitutional grounds and their First Amendment rights would be prohibited if the workers were forced to restrictive management under the government as the forty-hour work week. This rallied around from Broun's call for labor union and one would speak for all newsmen and newswomen.

Status in 1942 
In 1942 Henning Heldt, as a Nieman Fellow, contributed an article on the Newspaper Guild to a collection published by Nieman Fellows that year at Harvard University.

In 1934 a convention of the Guild was held in St. Paul, Minnesota. In an effort to elevate the standards of journalism, it was resolved:

Heldt described the radical past, arrival, and conservative turn of the Guild in 1942:

Positing a "legend of newsmen", Heldt lamented that the Guild finished off the legend:

In 1970s, the union expanded its scope outside of the United States. and adopted the name of Newspaper Guild or TNG. It also collaborated with another union called the Communications Workers of America (CWA) in 1977. The combined union had hundreds of thousands of workers in telecommunications and media, and later adopted a new name, The Newspaper Guild-CWA.

Campaigns 
On May 18, 2020, the NewsGuild launched the Save The News campaign to advocate for local news outlets as part of the federal government's response to the COVID-19 pandemic. Between January and August 2020, as many as 36,000 journalists had experienced pay cuts, furloughs, or layoffs.

As part of the campaign, the group has supported legislative efforts, such as S.3718, to expand access to the Paycheck Protection Program (PPP) for local news outlets that have been excluded from it, as well as H.R.7640 to create tax credits incentivizing subscribing to and advertising in local newspapers.

In July 2020 NewsGuild president Jon Schleuss sent a letter to Senate Majority Leader Mitch McConnell, noting his warning "that the local news industry is facing an extinction-level event".

On April 13, 2021, more than 650 tech workers at The New York Times announced that they were unionizing with the NewsGuild-CWA. In July 2021 the workers filed for union certification with the National Labor Relations Board. On August 11, 2021, the New York Times Tech Guild held a half-day work stoppage in protest of alleged union-busting tactics from the New York Times management for which the Guild filed at least three unfair labor practices charges with the NLRB. If the union is certified, it will be the largest union representing tech workers with collective bargaining rights in the country. The New York Times Tech Guild campaign exists within the broader context of the Campaign to Organize Digital Employees (CODE-CWA) initiative by the Communications Workers of America to organize tech, game, and digital workers in the US and Canada.

Presidents
1933: Heywood Broun
1940: Donal M. Sullivan
1941: Joseph Simons
Harry Martin
1953: Joseph F. Collis
1959: Arthur Rosenstock
1967: James B. Woods
1969: Charles Perlik
1987: Charles Dale
1995: Linda Foley
2008: Bernie Lunzer
2019: Jon Schleuss

See also 

 List of NewsGuild-CWA Locals
 C.H. Garrigues, union organizer
 San Francisco newspaper strike of 1994
Communications Workers of America
Campaign to Organize Digital Employees (CODE-CWA)

References

Archives 
The Walter P. Reuther Library is the official repository of The Newspaper Guild Official Archives. Walter P. Reuther Library, Wayne State University, Detroit, Michigan.
 Newspaper Guild Records, 1933–1973. 156.5 linear feet.
 St. Louis Newspaper Guild Local 47 Records, 1933–1966. 10.5 linear feet.
 Detroit Newspaper Guild Local 22 Records. 1933–2007. 67.25 linear feet.
 Pacific Northwest Newspaper Guild Local 82 Records. 1950–1976. 6.5 linear feet.
 Columbus Newspaper Guild Local 13 Records. 1934–1986. 5.5 linear feet.
 Newspaper Guild of Albany, N.Y., Local 34 Records. 1936–1989. 5.25 cubic feet.

External links 
Official website
 Roger A. Simpson Papers. "Records relating Simpson’s research on the Newspaper Guild in Seattle in the 1930s."

Trade unions in the United States
International Federation of Journalists
Journalists' trade unions
Trade unions established in 1933
Communications Workers of America
Guilds in the United States
American journalism organizations